"Jerry Was a Race Car Driver" is a song by the American funk metal band Primus. It was released as the first single from their 1991 album Sailing the Seas of Cheese and reached number 23 on the U.S. Alternative Songs chart. The song tells the stories of two characters, Jerry, an ill-fated race car driver who collides with a telephone pole while driving intoxicated (hence the use of "was", in the title) and Captain Pearce, a retired fireman.

History
"Jerry Was a Race Car Driver" was the fourth Primus single, after "John the Fisherman", "Too Many Puppies" and " Mr. Knowitall" from the 1989 live album Suck on This and 1990's debut studio release Frizzle Fry.

"Jerry Was a Race Car Driver" received heavy airplay on rock radio, and peaked at number 23 on the Modern Rock Tracks in 1991. The song features a sample of Bill Moseley's character Chop Top from the film The Texas Chainsaw Massacre 2, chuckling to himself then remarking: "Dog will hunt!"

"Jerry Was a Race Car Driver" appeared in the first Tony Hawk's Pro Skater video game, as well as the first ATV Offroad Fury video game, and in The Bigs. The song is included in Rock Band 3.

Music video
The music video begins with Bob Cock getting an order of nachos at an arcade, only to drop them after a collision with Larry LaLonde on a skateboard once outside. The rest of the video cuts between scenes of the band playing an out-of-control gig in a small club (Phoenix Theater in Petaluma, California), closeup shots of the fallen nachos, and race car footage. Some of the early race car footage was filmed at the Petaluma Speedway, a few blocks away from the Phoenix Theater. At the end, the camera zooms in on the cheese, and there is a claymation segment which features many of the creatures on the cover of the Sailing the Seas of Cheese album, then zooms back out to the cheese, where a pit bull eats/sniffs it, closing the video. The band would return to claymation for the "My Name is Mud" and "Southbound Pachyderm" videos years later.

In the video, Les Claypool's Rainbow Bass can be seen without its upper horn – this is because the bass was not balanced well, which caused Les to send it back to Carl Thompson to get it rebuilt entirely with its signature scroll horn attached. The video was created before the remake of the bass. The video became an MTV favorite at the time.

Reception
AllMusic writer Steve Huey thought that the song "established Primus as a freewheelingly unorthodox hard rock band with a memorable, utterly distinctive sound". He picked it as one of the highlights on the album.

Track listing
"Jerry Was a Race Car Driver" – 3:11

Charts

References 

Songs about occupations
Songs about driving under the influence
Songs about fictional male characters
1991 singles
Primus (band) songs
Experimental rock songs
Fictional racing drivers
Fictional firefighters
1991 songs
Interscope Records singles
Songs written by Les Claypool
Songs written by Tim Armstrong
Songs written by Larry LaLonde